Andrew Horatio Scott (August 6, 1789 – March 13, 1851) was an American lawyer and politician who served as a Justice of the Supreme Court for the Arkansas Territory from 1819 until 1825.

Scott was born in Hanover County, Virginia, and "eventually moved to Pope County, Arkansas Territory.

After serving two terms as an Arkansas territorial judge, he failed to receive senate confirmation for a third. He was also a delegate to the first Arkansas Constitutional Convention of 1836. He killed Judge Joseph Selden in a duel as well as General Edmund Hogan.

He died at Norristown, Pope County, Arkansas and is buried in the Oakland Cemetery in Russellville. Scott County, Arkansas was named for him.

Notes

People from Hanover County, Virginia
United States territorial judges
1789 births
1851 deaths
19th-century American judges